Coldra is an area within the electoral ward of Ringland, Newport, Wales. It lies between The Coldra Roundabout and Ringland, Newport.

References

Populated places in Newport, Wales
Neighbourhoods in Wales